Eric Ivan Rosse is an American composer, songwriter, record producer, and mixer.

Rosse started playing piano at age 8, eventually studying orchestration and arranging with Joe Rotundi Sr., whose mentorship—along with influences of soul, rock, art pop and classical music—has laid the foundation upon which he continues to build.

After playing in numerous bands as a keyboard player and singer, he expanded on his career by scoring TV and commercials; he then produced Tori Amos' albums Little Earthquakes and Under the Pink.

Since then, he has been instrumental in projects as diverse as Sara Bareilles' album Little Voice, Maroon 5, Birdy, Gavin DeGraw, Andra Day, Mary Lambert, and Benny Cassette.

Rosse has also worked with Pablo Alborán and Vanesa Martín Mata. He produced and composed Alborán's Terral, which received a Latin Grammy and Grammy nomination.

Rosse co-wrote with Steve Aoki and Louis Tomlinson penning the latter's solo debut single. The song is certified Gold and Platinum in several countries including reaching #1 on the US Dance/Electronic Sales Singles Billboard chart.

Through creative insight and intense focus, Rosse manages to bring impact and powerful appeal to the music he composes and produces, helping to create a unique musical and emotional voice for each project.

Life and career
Rosse was born in Chicago and began studying music at a young age starting with piano lessons. Through his training with Joe Rotundi Sr., he came to score an award-winning short film at the age of 17, Day's Last Rainbow, which was directed by James Herring. His first professional recording gig was at The Sound Factory in Hollywood, California, in 1980. Rosse was hired there to play electric piano on various R&B recordings, and continued gigging with various bands and musicians around Los Angeles until 1989, when he co-founded EMBR Music with his brother, Michael Carey. They operated for five years under the name EMBR, producing music spots for well-known media entities such as Coca-Cola, TDK, Anacin, Sega, Asics, NY Aids Awareness, NBC and CBS.

In 1994, Rosse began to focus heavily on album production, setting up his studio in unusual locations such as Taos and Santa Fe, New Mexico (where he produced Tori Amos' records), as well as Air Studios in London, where he produced projects for EMI-UK and Sony Music.

From 2002–2003, Rosse began working as an A&R consultant for Capitol Records, working with such artists as Lisa Marie Presley.

Currently, Rosse resides in Los Angeles and continues to produce, compose, and mix.

Discography

Singles
1991 Tori Amos – "Me and a Gun"
1992 Tori Amos – "Silent All These Years", "China", "Winter", "Crucify"
1994 Tori Amos – "God", "Pretty Good Year", "Cornflake Girl", "Past the Mission"
2003 Lisa Marie Presley – "Lights Out"
2004 & 2006 Anna Nalick – "Breathe (2 AM)"
2005 Lisa Marie Presley – "Dirty Laundry"
2007 Sara Bareilles – "Love Song"
2007 A Fine Frenzy – "Almost Lover" (Remix)
2008 Sara Bareilles – "Bottle It Up"
2008 George Stanford – "My Own Worst Enemy"
2008 The White Tie Affair – "Candle (Sick and Tired)"
2009 Sara Bareilles – "Gravity"
2009 Matt Hires – "Honey, Let Me Sing You a Song"
2009 Landon Pigg – "Falling in Love at a Coffee Shop"  
2010 Jason Castro – "That's What I'm Here For"
2014 Mary Lambert – "Secrets"
2016 Louis Tomlinson – "Just Hold On"

TV Placements
2009 "A Perfect Day" by Matt Hires (Private Practice) Season 2: Episode 15 – Acceptance
2009 "Out of the Dark" by Matt Hires (Grey's Anatomy) Season 6: Episode 6 – I Saw What I Saw
2010 "Honey, Let Me Sing You a Song" by Matt Hires (Life Unexpected) Pilot Episode
2010 "O Sunrise" by Matt Hires (Life Unexpected) Season 1: Episode 6 – Truth Unrevealed
2010 "Honey, Let Me Sing You a Song" by Matt Hires (Cougar Town) Season 1: Episode 12 – Scare Easy
2010 "The Way It Ends" by Landon Pigg (Grey's Anatomy) Season 6: Episode 24 Season Finale – Death and All His Friends
2011 "Breathe" by Anna Nalick (Grey's Anatomy) Season 7: Episode 18 – 
2012 "As It Seems" by Lily Kershaw (Criminal Minds) Season 7: Episode 24 Season Finale – Run Part Two
2013 "Forever" by Matt Hires (Grey's Anatomy) Season 9: Episode 12 – Walking on a Dream
2017 "I'll Stand By You" by Idina Menzel for the TV movie remake of the film Beaches
2017 "I Can Hear the Music" by Idina Menzel for the TV movie remake of the film Beaches

References

External links
 Official web site
 All Music
 Discogs

Record producers from Illinois
Songwriters from Illinois
Living people
People from Chicago
21st-century American composers
Year of birth missing (living people)
American male pianists
American keyboardists
American television composers
American audio engineers
American music arrangers
Mixing engineers
21st-century American male musicians
American male songwriters